Tresca may refer to:
 Carlo Tresca (1879–1943), Italian-born American anarchist
 Henri Tresca (1814–1885), French mechanical engineer